The 2013–14 Rider Broncs men's basketball team represented Rider University during the 2013–14 NCAA Division I men's basketball season. The Broncs, led by second year head coach Kevin Baggett, played their home games at Alumni Gymnasium and were members of the Metro Atlantic Athletic Conference. They finished the season 14–17, 9–11 in MAAC play to finish in a three way tie for sixth place. They advanced to the quarterfinals of the MAAC tournament where they lost to Iona.

Roster

Schedule

|-
!colspan=9 style="background:#900B36; color:#FFFFFF;"| Exhibition

|-
!colspan=9 style="background:#900B36; color:#FFFFFF;"| Regular season

|-
!colspan=9 style="background:#900B36; color:#FFFFFF;"| 2014 MAAC tournament

References

Rider Broncs men's basketball seasons
Rider
Rider Broncs
Rider Broncs